Sharon Warren is an American actress. She played Ray Charles' mother, Aretha Robinson, in the 2004 film Ray.

Biography
Warren was born in Opelika, Alabama. She is the daughter of David, a sheriff for Macon, Georgia, and Pebblin Warren, a Democratic politician. She went to Auburn University, majoring in finance and business, but dropped out in 1999 to pursue an acting career.

She portrayed Beneatha in a 1999 rendition of A Raisin in the Sun, and acted in Flying Over Purgatory alongside Ruby Dee. While acting on stage, Warren worked for an architectural firm to make ends meet.  She worked with Atlanta theater company Alliance Theatre for many years before appearing in Ray.

Warren landed the role of Aretha Robinson, the mother of Ray Charles, in biopic Ray. The film's director, Taylor Hackford, had witnessed Warren acting in a stage production and had her audition for the role. She won the part, being the only actress considered. Warren stated she used her grandmother as a basis while in character as Aretha. She received an NAACP Image Award nomination for Outstanding Supporting Actress in a Motion Picture for her work in the film. Warren later had a supporting role in the drama film Glory Road (2006).

Filmography

References

External links

African-American actresses
Actresses from Alabama
American film actresses
Living people
Delta Sigma Theta members
1975 births
21st-century American actresses
21st-century African-American women
21st-century African-American people
20th-century African-American people
20th-century African-American women